Provincial Trunk Highway 15 (PTH 15) is a provincial highway in the Canadian province of Manitoba.  It runs from Winnipeg's Perimeter Highway (where it meets with the city's Route 115) east to Elma where it ends at PTH 11.  PTH 15 and the portion of Route 115 east of PTH 59 are collectively known as Dugald Road.

On the trip between Winnipeg and Elma, several significant landmarks exist, as well as the towns of Dugald and Anola.  Also along that stretch of picturesque highway lies the longitudinal Centre of Canada, which is marked on PTH 1 several kilometres south.

History
PTH 15 was originally designated as a road from PTH 12 south to Steinbach then east, southeast and south via Piney to the Minnesota border. This was eliminated in 1939 as a result of the elimination of Municipal Roads. It is now PTH 12, PTH 52, PR 210, PR 203, and Highway 89.

Major intersections

References

015